The Association of Governing Bodies of Independent Schools (AGBIS) is the supporting and advisory organisation for governing bodies of independent schools in the UK, and is a member of the Independent Schools Council.

History
The Association of Governing Bodies of Public Schools, at that time boys' schools was founded in 1940. The Governing Bodies of Girls' Schools Association was formed in 1942 to represent independent girls' schools. The former association became the Governing Bodies Association in 1944 and represented both independent boys' and co-educational schools. The two associations merged in June 2002.

Structure
The association is based in Welwyn, England. The general secretary is Richard Harman. Governing bodies are admitted to membership if their heads are members of one of the following organisations: 
 The Headmasters' and Headmistresses' Conference 
 The Girls' Schools Association 
 The Independent Association of Preparatory Schools 
 The Independent Schools Association (UK) 
 The Society of Headmasters & Headmistresses of Independent Schools
 
Schools may also apply for associate membership if they are in membership of:
 Scottish Council of Independent Schools
 Welsh Independent Schools Council
 Council of British International Schools

References

External links
 Association of Governing Bodies of Independent Schools website

Education in Hertfordshire
Private schools in the United Kingdom
Organisations based in Hertfordshire
Organizations established in 2002
Private school organisations in England
Welwyn Garden City
2002 establishments in England
2002 in education